Megachile texensis is a species of bee in the family Megachilidae. It was described by Mitchell in 1956.

References

Texensis
Insects described in 1956